The 2013 CECAFA Cup (known as the GOtv CECAFA Challenge Cup for sponsorship reasons) was the 37th edition of the annual CECAFA Cup, an international football competition consisting of the national teams of member nations of the Council for East and Central Africa Football Associations (CECAFA). The tournament was held in Kenya from 27 November to 12 December.

Contested by twelve national teams, the tournament had Zambia invited as a guest nation to fill in for Djibouti, who failed to participate for a second consecutive year. This followed the tournament's recent tradition of inviting other African nations to take part once a CECAFA nation pulled out; Malawi were invited to take part in the previous edition held in Uganda, while they and Zimbabwe took part in 2011 after Eritrea withdrew from the competition.

Hosts Kenya ran out 2–0 winners in the final against three-time champions Sudan, with a brace from Allan Wanga securing the Harambee Stars their sixth title after losing to previous hosts Uganda at the same stage the previous year. The third place playoff was won by guests Zambia, who beat Tanzania 6–5 on penalties after playing out to a 1–1 draw after 90 minutes.

Background and sponsorship
On 25 November 2012, it was announced that Kenya was chosen to host the tournament after bids were placed by the host nation as well as Rwanda. However, their hosting of the tournament was not confirmed until a congress meeting for the Confederation of African Football held in Marrakesh, Morocco on 11 March 2013, after it was announced that the Football Kenya Federation had met all the requirements for hosting the tournaments with support from the Kenyan government. The capital city Nairobi, Mombasa, Kisumu, Machakos and Nakuru were identified as host cities for the tournament.

On 21 November 2013, CECAFA announced that GOtv would be the title sponsors of the tournament, having committed KSh.11.25 million/= towards the organisation of the event and a further Ksh. 45 million towards the broadcasting of all 26 matches. Other companies that were sponsoring the tournament were Coca-Cola, who committed KSh.6.5 million/=, and UAP Insurance, who committed KSh.5.5 million/=.

Of KSh.8.7 million/= (approx. US$100,000) that was allocated for prize money, the winners were to receive KSh.5.6 million/=, while the runners-up were to take home KSh.2.5 million/=. The third place playoff winners were to receive KSh.600,000/=.

Participants
The draw for teams to participate in the tournament was held during the tournament's launch on 15 November 2013. Alongside the 12 member nations of CECAFA, Ivory Coast, Malawi and Zambia were initially mooted as invitees for the tournament. However, CECAFA decided against inviting the Ivory Coast, with Secretary-General Nicholas Musonye saying that flying in Les Éléphants and keeping them in the country would cost the organisers over US$25,000.  The Football Association of Malawi decided not to enter a team for the tournament due to a lack of funds.

The following teams were confirmed to participate in the tournament:

 (invitee)

Match officials
The following 18 officials were appointed by CECAFA to participate in the tournament.

Referees

  Thierry Nkurunziza
  Luleseghed Ghebremichael
  Anthony Ogwayo
  Davies Omweno
  Louis Hakizimana
  Hagi Wiish
  Kheirala Murtaz
  Denis Batte
  Waziri Sheha

Assistant referees

  Gilbert Cheruiyot
  Tonny Kidiya
  Simba Honore
  Suleiman Bashir
  Frezer Sakara
  Mohammed Idam
  Ferdinand Chacha
  Samuel Kayondo
  Mark Ssonko

Group stage

The group stage began on 27 November and ended on 5 December. The matchdays were 27–29 November, 30 November–2 December and 3–5 December.

If two or more teams were equal on points on completion of the group matches, the following criteria were applied to determine the rankings (in descending order):

 Number of points obtained in games between the teams involved;
 Goal difference in games between the teams involved;
 Goals scored in games between the teams involved;
 Away goals scored in games between the teams involved;
 Goal difference in all games;
 Goals scored in all games;
 Drawing of lots.

Group A
Since Kenya and Ethiopia had the same statistics at the end of the group stage, a coin toss was used as the drawing of lots to determine the winner of Group A.

Group B

Group C

Third place qualification

Knockout stage

The knockout stage began on 7 December with the quarter-finals and ended on 12 December with the final. In this stage, teams played against each other once, with the losers of the semi-finals playing against each other in a third place playoff.

Bracket

Quarter-finals
The quarter-finals were played on 7–8 December.

Semi-finals
The semi-finals were played on 10 December.

Third place playoff

Final

Goalscorers

Final rankings

Teams are ranked using the same tie-breaking criteria as in the group stage, except for the top four teams.

|-
|colspan="14"|Eliminated in the quarter-finals
|-

|-
|colspan="14"|Eliminated in the group stage
|-

See also
 2013 Kagame Interclub Cup

References

External links
  (archived on 17 May 2014)

   
CECAFA Cup
CECAFA Cup
CECAFA Cup, 2013
CECAFA Cup
CECAFA Cup
CECAFA Cup